Saccopharynx paucovertebratis is a species of ray-finned fish within the family Saccopharyngidae. The species is known from a single a single holotype collected from a fishing trawl west of Madeira in the Atlantic Ocean at a depth up to 1700 meters. The holotype was measured at 30.5 centimeters in length. The IUCN Red List has assessed the species as 'Least concern' as there is there is little information regarding population, ecology, distribution, and potential threats.

References 

Fish described in 1985
Deep sea fish
Fish of the Atlantic Ocean
Saccopharyngidae
IUCN Red List data deficient species